Steven Antin (born April 19, 1958) is an American actor, stunt performer, screenwriter, producer, and director.

Early life 
Antin was born in Queens, New York City, the son of British Jewish immigrants. He is the brother of fellow actor Neil Antin, Pussycat Dolls founder Robin Antin, and celebrity hairstylist Jonathan Antin.

Career 
Antin was a co-lead in the 1982 film The Last American Virgin, and played Troy Perkins, the bad-guy preppie jock in Richard Donner's The Goonies. He also played one of the rapists in the Academy Award-winning film The Accused. Antin starred alongside David Warner in the independent film Drive.

Antin played the titular "Jessie" in Rick Springfield's "Jessie's Girl" video. His screenplay Inside Monkey Zetterland was turned into a film featuring many respected independent performers. In the late 1990s he made several appearances in gay-oriented films including It's My Party, co-starring Eric Roberts and comedian Margaret Cho. Antin himself later came out publicly. Antin also enjoyed a successful career as a stunt performer in dozens of films.

Antin has turned to working as a successful screenwriter, writing such films as Gloria (1999) and Chasing Papi. He also created, wrote and produced the television series Young Americans for The WB.

In the late 2000s, Antin turned to directing. He has directed several music videos, such as Girlicious' "Like Me" and Destinee & Paris' "FairyTale", and in 2006, the feature film Glass House: The Good Mother starring Angie Harmon, produced by Billy Pollina. He is one of the executive producers and creators of The CW's 2007 reality series which seeks to find the next member of the hit pop group, the Pussycat Dolls.

Antin is openly gay, and was once the boyfriend of David Geffen. They were together for a little more than one year.

Antin wrote and directed the 2010 film Burlesque.

Filmography as actor

References

External links 
 
 

1958 births
21st-century American Jews
American people of British-Jewish descent
American male film actors
American male screenwriters
American stunt performers
American male television actors
American television writers
American gay actors
American gay writers
American LGBT screenwriters
Jewish American male actors
Jewish American screenwriters
Gay Jews
LGBT people from New York (state)
Gay screenwriters
Living people
American male television writers
20th-century American LGBT people
21st-century American LGBT people